The Gramercy Bridge (officially the Veterans Memorial Bridge), is a cantilever bridge over the Mississippi River connecting Gramercy, Louisiana in St. James Parish with St. John the Baptist Parish. It is the second newest Mississippi River bridge in Louisiana (due to the completion of the John James Audubon Bridge), one of many built to replace the ferry system following a 1976 accident that killed 78 when a ferry with an inebriated pilot and crew sank after being struck by a ship.
The bridge and its approaches are Louisiana Highway 3213 (LA 3213), which runs 3.79 miles (6.10 km) from Louisiana Highway 18 on the west bank north over the bridge, past an interchange with Louisiana Highway 44, to its terminus at Louisiana Highway 641. (LA 641 continues north across U.S. Highway 61 (Airline Highway) to Interstate 10.)

LA 3213 now extends from the bridge to LA 3127 on a two lane roadway that crosses over railroad tracks about halfway down the road.

See also
List of crossings of the Lower Mississippi River

References

 Weeks III, John A. "LA-3213 Veterans Memorial Bridge, Gramercy, LA". http://www.johnweeks.com/lower_mississippi/pages/lmiss14.html. Retrieved January 31, 2006.
 

Bridges over the Mississippi River
Bridges completed in 1995
Road bridges in Louisiana
Cantilever bridges in the United States
Buildings and structures in St. James Parish, Louisiana
Buildings and structures in St. John the Baptist Parish, Louisiana